Vilhelm Møller (born 20 February 1922) was a Danish gymnast. He competed in eight events at the 1948 Summer Olympics.

References

External links
  

1922 births
Possibly living people
Danish male artistic gymnasts
Olympic gymnasts of Denmark
Gymnasts at the 1948 Summer Olympics